Saray helva (Turkish Saray Helvası) is a popular Turkish dessert.

Ingredients 	
The dessert is made of white sugar, wheat flour, butter, vegetable margarine and vanillin flavor.

See also

Sohan papdi
Shekarpareh
Pişmaniye
Sohan (confectionery)
Sohan Halwa
List of Turkish desserts

References

Bosnia and Herzegovina cuisine
Middle Eastern cuisine
Turkish pastries
Turkish desserts
Iranian desserts